The 2021 TCR Eastern Europe Trophy (also called 2021 TCR Eastern Europe Trophy powered by ESET for sponsorship reasons) is the third season of the TCR Eastern Europe Trophy. The season began on 15 April at the Hungaroring and will end on 5 September at Automotodrom Brno.

Calendar
A new calendar was announced on 17 March 2021 with all rounds supporting the ESET V4 Cup.

Teams and drivers

Results

Drivers' standings
Scoring system

† – Drivers did not finish the race, but were classified as they completed over 70% of the race distance.

Teams' standings

† – Drivers did not finish the race, but were classified as they completed over 70% of the race distance.

Juniors' standings

† – Drivers did not finish the race, but were classified as they completed over 70% of the race distance.

Notes

References

External links

TCR Eastern Europe Trophy
Eastern Europe Trophy